This is a list of all occasions where a football player was sent off from a FIFA World Cup match due to a foul or misconduct, either as a direct expulsion (red card) or as a second caution (yellow card) within the match.

This list includes all dismissals since the first World Cup in 1930. The use of physical red and yellow cards to respectively indicate dismissals and cautions is a later invention, having been introduced at the 1970 tournament.

Only players are listed, even if they were at the substitutes' bench at the time of the sending off. Managers and other technical staff members are not covered.

Statistics
 Plácido Galindo was the first player to be sent off in a World Cup match, playing for Peru against Romania in a 1930 match officiated by Alberto Warnken. Although physical red cards were introduced from 1970, they were not put in practice until the 1974 World Cup, when referee Doğan Babacan sent off Chile's Carlos Caszely during a match against West Germany.
 Two players have received red cards twice: Cameroon's Rigobert Song (1994 and 1998) and France's Zinedine Zidane (1998 and 2006).
 Five dismissals have taken place during final matches: Argentina's Pedro Monzón and Gustavo Dezotti (both 1990), France's Marcel Desailly (1998) and Zinedine Zidane (2006), and John Heitinga of the Netherlands (2010).
 Uruguay's José Batista received the quickest red card, in the first minute in a game against Scotland in 1986.
 A few expulsions either took place after the final whistle of the match or were awarded to players at the substitutes' bench (or both), and thus did not reduce the number of players on the pitch during the game. Two of them, that of Leandro Cufré of Argentina (vs Germany, 2006) and that of Denzel Dumfries of the Netherlands (vs Argentina, 2022), took place after the penalty shoot-outs of knockout matches, making them the latest red cards.
 Three goalkeepers have been sent off in the tournament: Italy's Gianluca Pagliuca (1994), South Africa's Itumeleng Khune (2010), and Wales's Wayne Hennessey (2022).
 The match with the most dismissals was Portugal vs Netherlands of 2006, when referee Valentin Ivanov dished out 4 red cards, 2 for each team.
 The referee who has sent off the most players is Arturo Brizio Carter, 7 red cards in 5 different matches (also a record).
 The team that has the greatest number of expulsed players is Brazil, with 11 – in 9 different matches, a record shared with Argentina. The team whose opponents have received the most red cards is Germany (incl. West Germany), with 20 – in 18 different matches, also a record.
 The 2006 World Cup had the highest amount of red cards: a total of 28 players were sent off (in 20 matches, also a record).

Notable incidents
 Of more than two dozen matches that had multiple player expulsions, a few are remembered for their exceptional violence and brutality: the "Battle of Bordeaux" (Brazil vs Czechoslovakia, 1938), the "Battle of Berne" (Hungary vs Brazil, 1954), the "Battle of Santiago" (Chile vs Italy, 1962), and the "Battle of Nuremberg" (Portugal vs Netherlands, 2006).
 During a 2010 quarter-final against Ghana, with the score tied at 1–1 going into stoppage time of the second period of extra time, Uruguayan striker Luis Suárez was red carded after famously denying a goal-bound header with his hand. Ghana missed the resulting penalty and went on to lose the subsequent penalty shoot-out; with a victory they would have become the first ever African team to reach the final four of the competition.
 During the 2006 final, French captain Zinedine Zidane was sent off after he famously headbutted the chest of Italy's Marco Materazzi, after a verbal provocation by Materazzi. This was the final act of Zidane's professional career, as he remained committed to his pre-tournament decision to retire after the tournament. France lost the final on penalties.
 During a 2006 match between Croatia and Australia, referee Graham Poll failed to send off Croatian player Josip Šimunić after the second yellow card, and only did so when he issued a third one, right after the final whistle minutes later. FIFA's report on the match initially listed all three bookings, but later the second one was removed; it is not known if the booking was retroactively overturned, or if this was done for report consistency purposes only.

Full list

Notes

See also
 List of UEFA European Championship red cards
 List of FIFA Confederations Cup red cards

Red card
FIFA World Cup records and statistics
World Cup red cards